Nikolaj Nyholm (born 13 September 1975) is a Danish serial technology entrepreneur and investor from Copenhagen, Denmark. He has founded four technology startups that have pioneered different domains, is an advisor to Minecraft creator Mojang, was a partner at the venture capital investor, Sunstone Capital (today Heartcore), and is currently the founder and chairman at Astralis.

Nyholm founded Speednames (later renamed Ascio Technologies) in 1999 and sold the company to London AIM-listed Group NBT in January 2007 for $36 million. In 2003, Nyholm founded Organic Network, a provider of managed Wi-Fi systems to large ISPs. The company was closed in late 2005, after having created the successful open source Wi-Fi firmware project OpenWrt, which now powers companies like FON.

After Organic Network, Nyholm spent a year as European evangelist for O'Reilly Media, Tim O'Reilly's tech publisher and conference organizer. There he co-organized the European Open Source Conference, among other accomplishments. While at O'Reilly, Nyholm co-founded Imity, a mobile social radar, which was acquired by ZYB, and later by Vodafone, for $50 million.

Nyholm then became the CEO of image recognition company Polar Rose, sold to Apple for a rumored $29 million. In 2008, Nyholm and Polar Rose were named Technology Pioneers by the World Economic Forum.

In January 2010, Nyholm joined venture capital firm Sunstone Capital (today Heartcore Capital) as a partner, where he invested in companies like Neo4j, PeakOn (acquired by Workday, Inc.), and Seriously (acquired by Playtika). Nyholm is a frequent speaker at technology conferences such as DLD, PICNIC, and O'Reilly Etech.

Personal life
He married former Finnish supermodel Niina Kurkinen in August 2017.

References

1975 births
Living people
Venture capitalists
Businesspeople from Copenhagen